Sorbonne may refer to:
 Sorbonne (building), historic building in Paris, which housed the University of Paris and is now shared among multiple universities.
The University of Paris (c. 1150 – 1970)
One of its components or linked institution, such as:
 College of Sorbonne (1253–1882), a theological college of the former University of Paris
one of its successors named "Sorbonne":
 Sorbonne University, Paris, including the former Paris 4, Paris 6, INSEAD, and other institutions
 Paris 1 Panthéon-Sorbonne University, Greater Paris
 Sorbonne Nouvelle University Paris 3, Paris
 Sorbonne Paris North University, Greater Paris (formerly Paris 13)
 Quartier de la Sorbonne, part of the 5th arrondissement of Paris

See also 
 Robert de Sorbon (1201–1274), founder of the College of Sorbonne
 Sorbon (disambiguation)
 Sorbonne Law School (disambiguation)
 Cluny–La Sorbonne (Paris Métro), Métro station